Clayotic is a brand of non-toxic, air-hardened modelling clay sold by the Irish company of the same name. It is the only Irish brand of modelling clay.

References

Craft materials
Manufacturing companies of Ireland
Irish companies established in 2011